Theodor Friedrich von Schubert may refer to:

Theodor von Schubert (1758-1825), astronomer
Friedrich von Schubert (1789-1865), son of the former, infantry general in the Russian army